Ironville is a civil parish in the Amber Valley district of Derbyshire, England.  The parish contains eleven listed buildings that are recorded in the National Heritage List for England.   All the listed buildings are designated at Grade II, the lowest of the three grades, which is applied to "buildings of national importance and special interest".  The parish contains the model village of Ironville and the surrounding area.  The Cromford Canal, now disused, runs through the parish, and the listed buildings associated with this are two bridges and three locks.  The other listed buildings consist of a former vicarage, a former doctor's house and surgery, a church with a war memorial in the churchyard, and a monument and a hall in Jessop Park.


Buildings

See also
Listed buildings in Ironville and Riddings Ward

References

Citations

Sources

 

Lists of listed buildings in Derbyshire